Tephrocactus articulatus is a species of cactus in the subfamily Opuntioideae of the plant family Cactaceae. They usually grow branches up to one foot tall with white flowers. Propagation is usually through cuttings.  Stem segments easily break away and will root without special treatment.  Plants may also be grown from seeds. Spring blooms open at end-of-evening nautical twilight, and close shortly after sunrise. 

They originate in Argentina, but are cultivated in outdoor landscaping in warm desert climates such as Phoenix, Arizona.

Varieties have been recognized, including var. inermis (spruce cone cactus) and var. papyracanthus (paper spine cholla cactus), but none are accepted by Plants of the World Online.

Images

Subspecies
 Tephrocactus articulatus var. articulatus
 Tephrocactus articulatus var. oligocanthus 
 Tephrocactus articulatus var. strobiliformis

References

Paper Spine Cactus (Tephrocactus articulatus)
Tephrocactus articulatus var. syringacanthus

External links

 Kew Plant List
 IPNI Listing

articulatus